Gabriel Oluwatimilehin Kayode Ibitoye (born 5 March 1998) is an English rugby union player for Bristol Bears in Premiership Rugby. His primary position is wing.

Career
Ibitoye began playing rugby at Trinity School (Croydon) aged 11, initially a forward he later moved to the centres and then wing.  His first club was Bromley R.F.C.

Ibitoye made his Harlequins debut in November 2017 against Saracens.

On 29 July 2020, Ibitoye left Harlequins to travel to France with Agen in the Top 14 on a two-year deal from the 2020-21 season. However, he was granted mutual release from the club where he instead signed for Montpellier as a medical joker for the rest of the 2020-21 season.

Following the end of his contract at Montpellier, he signed with Israeli side Tel Aviv Heat.

He was signed by Bristol Bears for the 2022/2023 season.

References

1998 births
Living people
English rugby union players
Esher RFC players
Harlequin F.C. players
Rugby union players from Lambeth
Rugby union wings
SU Agen Lot-et-Garonne players
Montpellier Hérault Rugby players
Tel Aviv Heat players
Expatriate rugby union players in Israel
Bristol Bears players
Expatriate rugby union players in France
English expatriate sportspeople in Israel
English expatriate sportspeople in France
English expatriate rugby union players
Black British sportspeople